Fox FM is a privately owned radio station in Kumasi, Ghana. Fox FM his is a multilingual radio station that broadcasts from Garden City, Oseikrom, Ghana, and can be listened both on 97.9 FM and online. The station is owned by Fracis Poku. Fox FM got awarded as one of Watchman Dog during the 2016 Election in Ghana.

Notable personalities
DJ Premier (Ghana)
Stephen Tetteh

References

External links 
Streaming Online

Radio stations in Ghana
Greater Accra Region
Mass media in Accra